The Legend of Zeta & Ozz (Spanish: La Leyenda de Zeta y Ozz) is a Chilean animated television series created by Jorge Orellana and Juan Pablo Álvarez.

It was created as a concept in 2017 and exhibited the following year at the Chilemonos animation festival, and was ultimately broadcast in a partnership with Cartoon Network. It was awarded best pitch at the Annecy International Animation Film Festival.

Premise 
Zeta and Ozz are the best friends in the world, very enthusiastic and above all with a great competitive spirit. Both want to be the best in everything and see the world around them as if it were a challenge to overcome. They are sure that no one can beat them at all and they are willing to prove it anyway, even if that means one failure after another.

Characters 

 Zeta: He is an orange fox with a grumpy and selfish personality. He also likes to compete against everyone and insult those he considers a loser.
 Ozz: He is a yellow bear with a childish personality and likes to be happy all the time.

References 



2019 Chilean television series debuts
Chilean animated television series